Molina Aterno is a comune and town in the province of L'Aquila in the Abruzzo region of central Italy. The name derives from Latin molina ("mill"), the second part having been added in 1889 due to the presence of the  Aterno river.

Main attractions include the church of Santa Maria del Colle (12th century), the church of San Nicola (with a 1632 bell tower) and the baronial Palace.

Transport 
Molina Aterno has a station on the Terni–Sulmona railway, with trains to L'Aquila and Sulmona.

References

Cities and towns in Abruzzo